The New York Americans were an American basketball team based in New York, New York that was a member of the American Basketball League.

The owners were "Martin L. Cohen and Phillip Fox & Associates"

Year-by-year

Basketball teams in New York City